This article is an incomplete list of the species of mammals, reptiles, amphibians, and fish found in the Sawtooth National Recreation Area in central Idaho.  Gray wolves were reintroduced to central Idaho in the 1990s while grizzly bears have been extirpated from the area, and plans to reintroduce them have been abandoned.  The Sawtooth National Recreation Area supports habitat for Canada lynx and wolverines, but there have been no recent sightings.

Birds
List of birds of the Sawtooth National Recreation Area

Mammals

American badger
American beaver
American marten
American pika
Bighorn sheep
Black bear
Bobcat
Brown rat
Bushy-tailed woodrat
Canadian lynx
Columbian ground squirrel
Common raccoon
Cougar
Coyote
Deer mouse
Elk
Fisher
Golden-mantled ground squirrel
Gray wolf (reintroduced)
Grizzly bear (extirpated)
House mouse
Long-tailed weasel
Marten
Masked shrew
Meadow vole
Mink
Moose
Mountain goat
Mule deer
Muskrat
Northern pocket gopher
Northern river otter
Porcupine
Pronghorn
Red fox
Red squirrel
Short-tailed weasel
Snowshoe hare
Southern red-backed vole
Striped skunk
Water shrew
Western jumping mouse
White-tailed jackrabbit
Wolverine
Yellow-bellied marmot
Yellow-pine chipmunk

Amphibians
Pacific tree frog
Long-toed salamander
Columbia spotted frog
Rocky Mountain tailed frog
Western toad

Reptiles
Bullsnake
Common garter snake
Rubber boa
Sagebrush lizard
Western skink
Western terrestrial garter snake

Fish
 
Brook trout (not native)
Bull trout
Chinook salmon
Lake trout
Longnose sucker
Mountain whitefish
Mottled sculpin
Rainbow trout
Redside shiner
Sockeye salmon
Westslope cutthroat trout
Wood River sculpin

See also

List of birds of the Sawtooth National Recreation Area
Sawtooth National Forest
Sawtooth National Recreation Area
Wolves at Our Door - 1997 documentary film about the Sawtooth Pack of wolves

References

External links
 U.S. Forest Service - Sawtooth National Recreation Area

Sawtooth National Forest
Sawtooth National Recreation Area